Sinan Sofuoğlu (15 July 1982 – 9 May 2008) was a Turkish motorcycle racer.

Biography
Part of the motorcycle racing Sofuoğlu family, he started racing at 15, and became drag champion in 1998. He continued his victories with championships won in Group B in 1999, and in Group A in the years 2001, 2002 and 2004. He finished the 2003 season in second. Sinan Sofuoğlu also won the Turkish championship in 2005.

He had a single wild-card ride in the Turkish 250cc round of Moto GP at Istanbul Park in April 2006, where he qualified 26th with a time of 2:05.532 and finished 19th (and last finisher) with an overall time of 40:44.241

Sinan Sofuoğlu died on May 9, 2008, at the age of 25 in the intensive care unit of Kocaeli University Hospital following a motorcycle accident. He was training for the Turkey Motorcycle Championship at İzmit Körfez Circuit in Körfez, Kocaeli, where he fell-off his motorcycle and suffered a broken neck, trauma at the base of his skull, and bleeding of the lungs.

The son of a motorcycle dealer in Adapazarı, Turkey, Sinan and his two other brothers Bahattin and Kenan were all motorcycle racers. His elder brother Bahattin, died in 2002 at the age of 24 following a road traffic accident where he was hit by a car whilst crossing the street.

Career statistics

By season

Races by year
(key)

See also
 Sofuoğlu family

References 

1983 births
2008 deaths
Sportspeople from Adapazarı
Turkish motorcycle racers
Motorcycle racers who died while racing
Sport deaths in Turkey
250cc World Championship riders
Sinan